Silviu Vexler (born 8 December 1988) is a Jewish-Romanian Politician and member of the Chamber of Deputies. A representative of the local Jewish Community, he has chaired various Jewish-Romanian organizations during his tenure. he assumed office on December 21, 2016

Biography 
Silviu Vexler was born on 8 December 1988 in Roman, Romania. he graduated in 2010 from Hyperion University, with a degree in Journalism. He was a member of the Federation of the Jewish Communities in Romania and served as an advisor to MP Aurel Vainer.

He was elected to the Chamber of Deputies in the 2016 election as a candidate of the Federation of Jewish Communities in Romania, after Vainer announced his retirement. Vexler married actress Geni Brenda, from the State's Jewish Theater, in September 2019.

References

Members of the Chamber of Deputies (Romania)
1988 births
Living people
Jewish Romanian politicians